Kytalyk National Park is a protected area for the Arctic breeding grounds of migratory birds on the East Asian–Australasian Flyway, including a significant portion  of sites for the critically endangered Siberian crane.  The name "kytalyk" is the Yakut-language word for the Siberian crane.  The park is on the low-lying tundra of the delta of the Indigirka River, on the East Siberian Sea in northern Russia.  The park was officially created in 2019.  The park is located in Allaikhovsky District of the Sakha Republic.

Topography
The park is in the Yana-Indigirka Lowland region on the northern coast of Yakutia.  The ground, averaging 50–80 meters above sea-level, is distorted by the effects of water and ice in the soil: thermokarst, pingos, baydzharakhs, alas depressions, sinkholes, and peat bogs.   Because water cannot evaporate, the soil is marshy and waterlogged.  Thawing occurs from mid-June to mid-September, with the depth of seasonal soil thawing varying from 0.2 to 1.8 meters.

Ecoregion and climate
The park is in the Northeast Siberian coastal tundra ecoregion.

The climate of the park is Tundra climate (Köppen climate classification ET), a local climate in which at least one month has an average temperature high enough to melt snow (0 °C (32 °F)), but no month with an average temperature in excess of 10 °C (50 °F).

Plants and animals
With shallow permafrost soils and a growing season of only 60–90 days, the flora is limited to plants adapted to the Arctic coastal tundra.  The dominant species of the saline meadows are Puccinellia phryganodes (a salt grass), Carex subspathacea (Hoppner's sedge), Cochlearia arctica (an Arctic species of scurvy-grass), and Stellaria humifusa (Saltmarsh starwort).  Sphagnum (Mosses) cover up to 50% of the terrain, represented by over 100 species.  70 species of lichen are present, with the most common being Cetraria cocullata.  The park has recorded 221 species of vascular plants, with the herbaceous cover reaching only an average of 25 cm in height.

Fauna are represented by 21 species of mammals (including  Brown lemming, Arctic lemming, Muskrat, and Musk ox), 84 of terrestrial invertebrates, and 28 of fish.  Of birds there are recorded 96 species, of which 63 breed in the park.

On the southern edge of the park is the "Berelekh mammoth cemetery", where scientists have discovered a mass burial site of over 140 mammoths.

See also
 Protected areas of Russia

References

External links
 Map of Kytalyk National Park at Protected Planet.net

National parks of Russia